Ski cross is a skiing competition which incorporates terrain features traditionally found in freestyle skiing with courses which include big-air jumps and high-banked turns. In spite of the fact that it is a timed racing event, it is often considered a type of freestyle skiing. What sets ski cross apart from other alpine skiing disciplines is that it involves more than one skier racing down the course. Any intentional contact with other competitors like grabbing or any other forms of contact meant to give the competitor an advantage leads to disqualification.

Ski cross is a part of the FIS Freestyle World Ski Championships, the world championship organized by the FIS for freestyle skiing. First organized in 1986, the world championship is now held every odd year. In 2010 the sport debuted as a part of the Winter Olympic Games and has been contested ever since. It was a part of the Winter X Games until 2012.

Overview
In a time trial or qualification round, every competitor skis down the course, which is built to encompass both naturally occurring terrain and artificial features like jumps, rollers or banks. After the time trial, the fastest 32 skiers (fastest 16 if not 32 competitors) compete in a knockout series in rounds of four. A group of four skiers start simultaneously and attempt to reach the end of the course. The first two to cross the finish line will advance to the next round. At the end, the big final and small final rounds determine 1st to 4th and 5th to 8th places, respectively.

History
The idea for a multi-racer single run with obstacles seems to have been borne at Alyeska Ski Resort in Alaska (USA) during the late 1970s. A group of racers, led by Scott Hunter an employee at Alyeska wanted to take advantage of the mountain's natural bobsled-like gullies and rollers in a race that was a hybrid between a downhill ski race and Motocross. It eventually evolved into a race using up to 5 skiers on the course at the same time, all racing against each other.  No ski poles were allowed, and racers were allowed to interfere and contact other racers as much as they wished.  As a result, there were typically several falls (and some injuries) from intentional collisions during each run.  Interest waned in the early 1980s due to athletes graduating high school and leaving for college, while other racers concentrated on USSA and FIS sanctioned events.  The last ski cross event on the original “silvertip” track occurred in the early 1980s.

A similar idea originated with Jim "Too Tall" Essick, one of the founders of Recreational Sports Marketing (RSM), in the late 1980s. Essick wanted to bring the excitement of motocross to skiing, in order to make ski races more exciting for spectators. The idea was pitched to several corporations, but none wanted to sponsor the concept at the time. In 1991, a television programme filmed a snowboard cross segment, and the name "boarder cross" was trademarked. Eventually, similar events were staged with skis and, thus, skier cross was born.

FIS Freestyle World Ski Championships
In addition to moguls and aerials, ski cross competitions were added to the International Ski Federation (FIS)'s FIS Freestyle Skiing World Cup calendar in 2004.

Winter Olympic Games
Ski cross debuted in the Olympics at the 2010 Winter Olympics where Michael Schmid won the men's event, and Ashleigh McIvor of Canada won the women's event.

In the 2014 Winter Olympics France's Men swept the podium while in the women's event, Canadians Marielle Thompson and Kelsey Serwa finished first and second respectively. Swedish athlete Anna Holmlund took bronze.

In the 2018 Winter Olympics in Korea, Canada continued its domination of the sport. Kelsey Serwa won her second Olympic medal, this time a gold. Canadian teammate Brittany Phelan took home the silver. Swiss skier Fanny Smith won bronze. On the men's side, Brady Leman got redemption after crashing in the final at Sochi by winning gold in Korea. Swiss athlete Marc Bischofberger won silver and Russian Sergey Ridzik won bronze (competing under the Olympic Flag).

Winter X Games

Ski cross was in the first fifteen Winter X Games, an event which features extreme sports, and was in all Winter X Games until the 2012 Winter X Games. Ski cross, boardercross, and mono ski cross were cut from the 2013 Winter X Games due to the cost of building the cross course.

See also
List of Olympic medalists in freestyle skiing
List of Olympic venues in freestyle skiing
Snowboard cross
Ice cross downhill

References

External links 

AP Winter Games Video: Ralves, Puckett Debut Skicross at Games
AP Winter Games Video, Sports Explainer: Ski Cross
 CanWest News Service: "Ski Cross glossary" - 2010 Winter Games

Freestyle skiing
Types of skiing
Snow sports